Wachapreague may refer to:

People
The Wachapreague people, an Algonquian people that lived in coastal Virginia centuries ago.

Places
Wachapreague, Virginia, a town in Accomack County, Virginia
Wachapreague Channel, an inlet on the eastern shore of Virginia

Ships
USS Wachapreague (AVP-56), a United States Navy seaplane tender laid down in 1943 but converted during construction into the motor torpedo tender USS Wachapreague (AGP-8)
USS Wachapreague (AGP-8), a United States Navy motor torpedo boat tender in commission from 1944 to 1946